Fremont is a town in Rockingham County, New Hampshire, United States. The population was 4,739 at the 2020 census, up from 4,283 at the 2010 census. Fremont is crossed by the Rockingham Recreation Trail (a rail trail) and NH Route 107.

History
Settled in the 1720s, Fremont was originally part of Exeter. The area was once famous for its heavy growth of high-quality eastern white pine trees, reserved for use as masts of the Royal Navy. But residents began to use the wood for home construction. When in 1734 David Dunbar, surveyor-general, visited the Copyhold Mill to inspect fallen lumber, local citizens assembled, discharged firearms, and convinced Dunbar to leave. Dunbar returned emboldened with 10 men, but was forced to flee to a local tavern after citizens disguised as Indians attacked them. This insurrection became known as the Mast Tree Riot.

The town was granted in 1764 by colonial governor Benning Wentworth as "Poplin". In 1853, Poplin petitioned the state legislature to change the name. In 1854, it became "Fremont" after General John C. Frémont, the first candidate of the Republican Party in the presidential election of 1856.

The town is noted for the unspoiled Fremont Meeting House, built in 1800 and listed on the National Register of Historic Places since 1993. The town was once home to the largest brickyard in the state, producing five million bricks a year, and to the downtown Spaulding & Frost Cooperage, established in 1874, one of the oldest operating wooden barrel manufacturers in the country.

B-52 crash
On August 10, 1959, a Boeing B-52 Stratofortress crashed in Fremont. The aircraft, serial number 54-2682, had departed Westover Air Force Base in Chicopee, Massachusetts. The pilot remained with the aircraft for several additional minutes, then ejected. The plane crashed into Spruce Swamp at 2:50p.m. local time. The pilot and seven crew members all survived. The crash was attributed to a failure of the radome on the nose of the aircraft.

Geography
The town is drained by the Exeter River, except for the northernmost part which is drained by headwaters of the Piscassic River. Fremont lies fully within the Piscataqua River (Coastal) watershed.

Adjacent municipalities
 Epping, New Hampshire (north)
 Brentwood, New Hampshire (east)
 Kingston, New Hampshire (southeast)
 Danville, New Hampshire (south)
 Sandown, New Hampshire (southwest)
 Chester, New Hampshire (southwest)
 Raymond, New Hampshire (northwest)

Demographics

As of the census of 2000, there were 3,510 people, 1,165 households, and 983 families residing in the town.  The population density was 204.6 people per square mile (79.0/km2).  There were 1,201 housing units at an average density of 70.0 per square mile (27.0/km2).  The racial makeup of the town was 98.15% White, 0.06% African American, 0.06% Native American, 0.34% Asian, 0.51% from other races, and 0.88% from two or more races. Hispanic or Latino of any race were 0.77% of the population.

There were 1,165 households, out of which 44.0% had children under the age of 18 living with them, 74.1% were married couples living together, 5.8% had a female householder with no husband present, and 15.6% were non-families. 10.4% of all households were made up of individuals, and 3.5% had someone living alone who was 65 years of age or older.  The average household size was 2.99 and the average family size was 3.20.

In the town, the population was spread out, with 29.1% under the age of 18, 5.3% from 18 to 24, 38.0% from 25 to 44, 20.5% from 45 to 64, and 7.2% who were 65 years of age or older.  The median age was 36 years. For every 100 females, there were 96.4 males.  For every 100 females age 18 and over, there were 96.4 males.

The median income for a household in the town was $62,171, and the median income for a family was $63,808. Males had a median income of $45,560 versus $27,964 for females. The per capita income for the town was $24,082.  About 3.8% of families and 4.2% of the population were below the poverty line, including 5.1% of those under age 18 and 5.0% of those age 65 or over.

Transportation 
Two New Hampshire state routes cross Fremont.

NH 107 crosses from Raymond in the northwest to Brentwood in the southeast, following Main Street through the center of town.
NH 111A enters from Danville in the south, runs along Danville Road north to Main Street, then joins a concurrency with NH 107 running east, before leaving along Middle Road to the north shortly before entering Brentwood.

Sites of interest
 Rockingham Recreation Trail: Fremont Branch
 Fremont Meeting House (1800), also known as the Poplin Meeting House, one of only two 18th century twin-porch meeting houses in New England
 Fremont Town Hall (1911), the only tin-sided town hall in New Hampshire
 1820 Country Market and Deli, fourth-oldest country store in New Hampshire and tenth-oldest in New England

Notable people
Lee Bergere (1918–2007), actor known for his work on Dynasty; lived in Fremont for some time before his death
Dan Itse (born 1958), former New Hampshire State Representative from Rockingham County
The Shaggs, American all-female rock and outsider music band formed in Fremont in 1968

See also

 New Hampshire Historical Marker No. 142: Mast Tree Riot of 1734
 New Hampshire Historical Marker No. 156: John Brown Family – Gunsmiths
 New Hampshire Historical Marker No. 157: Spaulding & Frost Cooperage
 New Hampshire Historical Marker No. 167: Meetinghouse and Hearse House
 New Hampshire Historical Marker No. 170: Civil War Riot of 1861
 New Hampshire Historical Marker No. 277: Cold War-Era Bomber Crash

References

External links
 
 Fremont Public Library
 New Hampshire Economic and Labor Market Information Bureau Profile

 
Towns in Rockingham County, New Hampshire
Towns in New Hampshire
1764 establishments in New Hampshire